Valentina Favazza (born October 10, 1987) is an Italian voice actress.

Biography
Born in Aosta, Favazza has been active in the Italian dubbing industry since 2005. At the age of seven, Favazza would often listen to the Italian dialogue in international films, which is what inspired her to become a voice dubber. She is best known for having voiced Jyn Erso in the Italian dub of Rogue One: A Star Wars Story as well as dubbing Daisy Johnson in Agents of S.H.I.E.L.D.. Some of the actresses she is known for dubbing includes Felicity Jones, Alicia Vikander, Shailene Woodley, Chloe Bennet, Lily Collins and Jennifer Lawrence. In 2015 she participated in the "Oscar Marathon" organized by Vanity Fair and Sky.

In 2016, she received the Leggio d'oro award for her performance in dubbing over Alicia Vikander's characters in The Danish Girl and Suffragette.

Personal life
On September 19, 2019, Favazza gave birth to a son, Enea, through her relationship with voice actor Flavio Aquilone.

Dubbing roles

Animation
Glim in Mune: Guardian of the Moon
Mary Jane Watson in Ultimate Spider-Man
Jyn Erso in Star Wars: Forces of Destiny
Jamie in The Amazing World of Gumball (Season 1)
Shelly in A Turtle's Tale: Sammy's Adventures
Agnes in Fantastic Mr. Fox
Kiki in Robinson Crusoe
Greta in Ferdinand
Virginia in Lola & Virginia 
Garnet & Alexandrite in Steven Universe
Sasha Braus in Attack on Titan
Lila Rossi in Miraculous: Tales of Ladybug & Cat Noir
Queen Rapsheeba in ChalkZone
Yoko Littner in Tengen Toppa Gurren Lagann
Miki Aono/Cure Berry in Fresh Pretty Cure!

Live action
Santa Paws in The Search for Santa Paws
Santa Paws' son in Santa Buddies
Jyn Erso in Rogue One: A Star Wars Story
Daisy Johnson in Agents of S.H.I.E.L.D.
Rosie Dunne in Love, Rosie
Mystique in X-Men: First Class
Mystique in X-Men: Days of Future Past
Mystique in X-Men: Apocalypse
Sophie in We Are Your Friends
Anna in Chloe
Kalique Abrasax in Jupiter Ascending
Alice Deane in Seventh Son
Eva in StreetDance 2

References

External links

 
 
 

1987 births
Living people
People from Aosta
Italian voice actresses
21st-century Italian actresses